Friendsville is a borough in Susquehanna County, Pennsylvania, United States. The population was 100 at the 2020 census.

History
Friendsville was founded in 1819, and named for the fact a large share of the first settlers were Quakers.

Geography
Friendsville is located at  (41.917987, -76.046952).

Demographics

2010 census
At the 2010 census there were 111 people, 44 households, and 29 families living in the borough. The population density was 74 people per square mile (28.9/km2). There were 54 housing units at an average density of 36 per square mile (14.1/km2). The racial makeup of the borough was 91.9% White, 6.3% Black, and 1.8% Native American.
Of the 44 households 31.8% had children under the age of 18 living with them, 52.3% were married couples living together, 11.4% had a female householder with no husband present, and 34.1% were non-families. 22.7% of households were one person and 11.4% were one person aged 65 or older. The average household size was 2.52 and the average family size was 2.97.

The age distribution was 27.9% under the age of 18, 55% from 18 to 64, and 17.1% 65 or older. The median age was 42.5 years.

The median household income was $35,625 and the median family income  was $51,250. Males had a median income of $29,464 versus $37,917 for females. The per capita income for the borough was $15,996. There were 15.6% of families and 9.6% of the population living below the poverty line, including 7.9% of under 18 and none of those over 65.

2000 census
At the 2000 census there were 91 people, 38 households, and 25 families living in the borough. The population density was 62.0 people per square mile (23.9/km2). There were 45 housing units at an average density of 30.7 per square mile (11.8/km2).  The racial makeup of the borough was 100.00% White.
Of the 38 households 26.3% had children under the age of 18 living with them, 55.3% were married couples living together, 7.9% had a female householder with no husband present, and 34.2% were non-families. 23.7% of households were one person and 5.3% were one person aged 65 or older. The average household size was 2.39 and the average family size was 2.88.

The age distribution was 23.1% under the age of 18, 6.6% from 18 to 24, 26.4% from 25 to 44, 31.9% from 45 to 64, and 12.1% 65 or older. The median age was 42 years. For every 100 females there were 106.8 males. For every 100 females age 18 and over, there were 94.4 males.

The median household income was $53,125 and the median family income  was $53,750. Males had a median income of $31,250 versus $24,375 for females. The per capita income for the borough was $18,502. There were 9.4% of families and 6.8% of the population living below the poverty line, including 9.4% of under eighteens and none of those over 64.

References

Boroughs in Susquehanna County, Pennsylvania
Populated places established in 1819